The Sunrise Trail is a 1931 American Western film directed by John P. McCarthy and written by Wellyn Totman. Produced by Trem Carr, the film was released on 7 February 1931 by Tiffany Productions, Inc.

Premise 
Tex, working undercover for the sheriff to expose a gang of cattle rustlers, crosses the Mexican border and ends up at a tavern called Sadie's Place. There he becomes friends with Kansas, an outlaw and with Goldie, a fugitive from justice with whom he falls in love. Tex discovers that the murder committed by Goldie was ruled justifiable homicide but cannot tell her or he will blow his cover. Goldie helps Tex enter the gang but discovers Rand knows he is an undercover agent. After she warns Tex, he convinces her to leave Mexico under the pretense of fleeing further north to Canada. After he gives his information to the sheriff, Tex kills Rand in a shoot-out while Kansas is fatally shot by the posse. Kansas forgives Tex as he dies, and Tex and Goldie decide to get married.

Cast 
Bob Steele as Tex 
Blanche Mehaffey as Goldie
Jack Clifford as Kansas
Germaine de Neel as French Sadie
Eddie Dunn as Rand
Fred Burns as the sheriff

See also 
Bob Steele filmography
List of American films of 1931

References

External links 
 
 

Films directed by John P. McCarthy
American Western (genre) films
1931 Western (genre) films
1931 films
American black-and-white films
Films set in Mexico
1930s American films